The Lesbian and Gay Inter-University Organization is an LGBT organization in Turkey aimed at university students. It is Turkey's largest LGBT organization.

History
The idea of bringing together homosexual university students began in 1996. Soon afterwards it was called LEGATO. In 1997, the group, inspired by METU, opened another office in Hacettepe University. In LEGATO's early years, they took part in many LGBT-related activities, such as opening stands in spring festivals, arranging weekly meetings, broadcasting movies, putting up posters, etc.. Thus, many university students were gradually becoming more aware of their own university's gay community. However, being either a member or founder of either of the groups ruined their chances of graduation.

After keeping quiet, two years later, with the GayAnkara group being the forefoot of the project, LEGATO found life again. As the first stage, on 28 June 2000, email listings opened to 23 universities (84 as of 2006).

LEGATO began to spread out from Ankara to Istanbul, starting at Boğaziçi University. Soon, campus meetings were organized, a website was made, and the group engaged in many cultural activities. Meanwhile, the list of email addresses was expanding, as was the group.

On 20 December 2000 the LEGATOs maintained contact with each other by creating the Legato Ortakliste (Legato union list) and on 10 January 2001 all the LEGATO offices in Istanbul (more than 60) arranged one big gathering.

On 19 January 2002 none of the universities were able to maintain the attendance levels by themselves and intended continuance, so all Istanbul LEGATO branches decided to merge as one unified group. From this day onwards LEGATO has become much faster and organized. Composed of students, graduates and academics, to this day LEGATO is arguably Turkey's biggest and most active homosexual group.

Goals
 To bring homosexual university students together
 To educate the Turkish community more about homosexuals
 To tackle homophobia
 To maintain contact amongst homosexual university students
 To support homosexual students during their lives at university

Some of LEGATO's activities
The 7th Sociology Students Meeting
H2000 Music Festival - LGBT stand
Sexuality Questioning Project - stand-panel at Sabancı University
Spring Festivals - LGBT stand/displays at Hacettepe, Boğaziçi Universities
Homophobia conference - stand/display at Istanbul Bilgi University
Traditional LEGATO picnic at the Anadolu Kavağı in Istanbul
ILGA-Europe meeting in Lisbon, Portugal
LEGATO meeting 28 October 2002 in Istanbul
Anti-War Protests in Istanbul and Ankara
1 May pride march in Istanbul
Legato film showing of Cahil Periler
1st LEGATO party on 14 December 2002 in Mor Cafe/Bar, Istanbul
2nd LEGATO party on 18 February 2003 in Douche Pera, Istanbul
3rd LEGATO party on 28 April 2003 Love Dance Point, Istanbul
Mimar Sinan Spring Festivals in Istanbul
METU Spring Festivals in Ankara
Violence and discrimination directed at homosexuals symposium at the Istanbul Bilgi University
Boğaziçi University Graduates Federation - Boğaziçi Magazine report
Radikal newspaper report
Sabah newspaper report

See also
Gay rights in Turkey
KAOS GL

External links
LEGATO Website 

LGBT organizations in Turkey